All Inclusive is a 2011 Russian crime comedy film directed by Edouard Radzyukevich.

Plot
The life of Andrei (Mikhail Bespalov), owner of an expensive and in-demand veterinary clinic for pets in Rublyovka, is a success. Moreover, he is not deprived of attention from beautiful female owners of cute little animals. But a passionate night with oligarch's wife Evelina (Nonna Grishayeva) changes everything: the jealous husband Edik (Roman Madyanov) very intelligibly explains that he will turn the sweet life of the successful businessman upside down. The only way out is to escape from the country. Andrei leaves for Turkey for an all-inclusive resort, not suspecting that it includes much more than seems at first glance. Behind him on the heels follows the German killer Rudolf (Eduard Radzyukevich), and the sunny beaches become the most important test in life.

Cast
Mikhail Bespalov — Andrey / Veniamin Pyatnitsa
Marina Aleksandrova — Anna
Nonna Grishayeva — Evelina
Roman Madyanov — Eduard Petrovich Budko, the oligarch
Fyodor Dobronravov — Peter
Eduard Radziukevich — Rudolf
Anna Ardova — Galya
Andrey Kaykov — Borya
Miroslava Karpovich and Denis Yasik — newlyweds
Olga Medynich — Natasha
Maria Deniakina — Marianna Vladimirovna
Grigory Siyatvinda — Karaduman
Galina Konshina — woman who keeps repeating: "Valera, I'm here!"
Eugene Voskresensky — psychiatrist
Ella Merkulova — Border Guard
Anton Shavrin — Vitalik
Elena Shvets — 1st blonde
Mariya Kiselyova — 2nd blonde
Petar Zekavitsa — German
Masha Malinovskaya — Masha (cameo)
Anfisa Chekhova — Anfisa (cameo)
Victoria Daineko — Vika (cameo)
Alexei Ryzhov — member of the group Diskoteka Avariya (cameo)
Nikolay Timofeev — member of the group Diskoteka Avariya (cameo)
Alexey Serov — member of the group Diskoteka Avariya (cameo)

References

External links
Official website

Russian crime comedy films
2010s crime comedy films
Films shot in Turkey
2011 directorial debut films
2011 films
2011 comedy films
2010s Russian-language films